Apartment 4E is a 2012 American mystery drama film written and directed by Russell Leigh Sharman and starring Nicole Beharie and Christopher Domig.

Cast
Nicole Beharie as Piper
Christopher Domig

Release
The film premiered at the Urbanworld Film Festival and the Pan African Film Festival in 2012.  It was later released on DVD on May 21, 2013.

References

External links
 
 

American mystery drama films
2012 drama films
2012 films
Films set in apartment buildings
2010s English-language films
2010s American films